Oliver Twist is a 1948 British film and the second of David Lean's two film adaptations of Charles Dickens novels. Following his 1946 version of Great Expectations, Lean re-assembled much of the same team for his adaptation of Dickens' 1838 novel, including producers Ronald Neame and Anthony Havelock-Allan, cinematographer Guy Green, designer John Bryan and editor Jack Harris. Lean's then-wife, Kay Walsh, who had collaborated on the screenplay for Great Expectations, played the role of Nancy. John Howard Davies was cast as Oliver, while Alec Guinness portrayed Fagin and Robert Newton played Bill Sykes (Bill Sikes in the novel).

In 1999, the British Film Institute placed it at 46th in its list of the top 100 British films. In 2005 it was named in the BFI list of the 50 films you should see by the age of 14.

Plot 
A young woman in labour makes her way to a parish workhouse and dies after giving birth to a boy, who is systematically named Oliver Twist (John Howard Davies) by the workhouse authorities. As the years go by, Oliver and the rest of the child inmates suffer from the callous indifference of the officials in charge: beadle Mr. Bumble (Francis L. Sullivan) and matron Mrs. Corney (Mary Clare). When Oliver is nine, the hungry children draw straws; Oliver loses and has to ask for a second helping of gruel: "Please sir, I want some more."

For his impudence, he is promptly apprenticed to the undertaker Mr. Sowerberry (Gibb McLaughlin), from whom he receives somewhat better treatment. However, when another worker, Noah, maligns his dead mother, Oliver flies into a rage and attacks him, earning the orphan a whipping.

Oliver runs away to London. The Artful Dodger (Anthony Newley), a skilled young pickpocket, notices him and takes him to Fagin (Alec Guinness), an old Jew who trains children to be pickpockets. Fagin sends Oliver to watch and learn as the Dodger and another boy try to rob Mr. Brownlow (Henry Stephenson), a rich, elderly gentleman. Their attempt is detected, and Oliver is chased through the streets by a mob and arrested. A witness clears him. Mr. Brownlow takes a liking to the boy and gives him a home. Oliver experiences the kind of happy life he has never had before, under the care of Mr. Brownlow and the loving housekeeper, Mrs. Bedwin (Amy Veness).

Meanwhile, Fagin is visited by the mysterious Monks (Ralph Truman), who has a strong interest in Oliver. He sends Monks to Bumble and Mrs. Corney (Mary Clare) (now Bumble's domineering wife); Monks buys from them the only thing that can identify Oliver's parentage, a locket containing his mother's portrait.

By chance, Fagin's associate, the vicious Bill Sykes (Robert Newton), and Sykes' kind-hearted girlfriend (and former Fagin pupil) Nancy (Kay Walsh) run into Oliver on the street and forcibly take him back to Fagin. Nancy feels pangs of guilt and, seeing a poster in which Mr. Brownlow offers a reward for Oliver's return, contacts the gentleman and promises to deliver Oliver the next day. The suspicious Fagin, however, has had the Dodger follow her. When Fagin informs Sykes, the latter becomes enraged and murders her, believing that she has betrayed him.

The killing brings down the wrath of the public on the gang – particularly Sykes who attempts to make his escape by taking Oliver hostage. Clambering over the rooftops, and with climbing rope hung around his neck, Sykes is shot by one of the mob and is accidentally hanged as he loses his footing. Mr. Brownlow and the authorities rescue Oliver. Fagin and his other associates are rounded up. Monks' part in the proceedings is discovered, and he is arrested. He was trying to ensure his inheritance; Oliver, it turns out, is Mr. Brownlow's grandson. For their involvement in the Monks' scheme, Mr. and Mrs. Bumble lose their jobs at the workhouse. Oliver is happily reunited with his newly found grandfather and Mrs. Bedwin, his search for love ending in fulfillment.

Cast 

 Robert Newton as Bill Sykes
 Alec Guinness as Fagin
 Kay Walsh as Nancy
 Francis L. Sullivan as Mr. Bumble
 Henry Stephenson as Mr. Brownlow
 Mary Clare as Mrs. Corney
 Anthony Newley as the Artful Dodger
 Josephine Stuart as Oliver's Mother
 Ralph Truman as Monks
 Kathleen Harrison as Mrs. Sowerberry
 Gibb McLaughlin as Mr. Sowerberry, undertaker	
 Amy Veness as Mrs. Bedwin
 Frederick Lloyd as Mr. Grimwig
 John Howard Davies as Oliver Twist
 Henry Edwards as Police Official
 Ivor Barnard as Chairman of the Board
 Maurice Denham as Chief of Police
 Michael Dear as Noah Claypole
 Michael Ripper as Barney
 Peter Bull as Landlord of "Three Cripples" tavern
 Deidre Doyle as Mrs. Thingummy, the old woman in workhouse 
 Diana Dors as Charlotte
 Kenneth Downy as Workhouse Master
 W.G. Fay as Bookseller
 Edie Martin as Annie
 Fay Middleton as Martha
 Graveley Edwards as Mr. Fang
 John Potter as Charley Bates (character credited as Charlie Bates)
 Maurice Jones as Workhouse Doctor
 Hattie Jacques and Betty Paul as Singers at "Three Cripples" tavern
 Jake as Bull's Eye (Syke's dog)

Anti-Semitism controversy 

Although critically acclaimed, Alec Guinness's portrayal of Fagin and his make-up was considered anti-semitic by some as it was felt to perpetuate Jewish racial stereotypes. Guinness wore heavy make-up, including a large prosthetic nose, to make him look like the character as he appeared in George Cruikshank's illustrations in the first edition of the novel. At the start of production, the Production Code Administration had advised David Lean to "bear in mind the advisability of omitting from the portrayal of Fagin any elements or inference that would be offensive to any specific racial group or religion." 

Lean commissioned the make-up artist Stuart Freeborn to create Fagin's features; Freeborn had suggested to David Lean that Fagin's exaggerated profile should be toned down for fear of causing offence, but Lean rejected this idea. In a screen test featuring Guinness in toned-down make-up, Fagin was said to resemble Jesus Christ. On this basis, Lean decided to continue filming with a faithful reproduction of Cruikshank's Fagin, pointing out that Fagin was not explicitly identified as Jewish in the screenplay.

When released in 1948, the film was criticized by American columnist  Albert Deutsch, who had seen the film in London. Deutsch wrote that even Dickens "'could not make Fagin half so horrible,' and warned that the film would fan the flames of anti-Semitism."  The New York Board of Rabbis appealed to Eric Johnston, head of the Production Code Administration, to keep the film out of the U.S. Other Jewish groups also objected, and the Rank Organization announced in September 1948, that U.S. release was "indefinitely postponed." 

As a result of such protests, the film was not released in the United States until 1951, with 12 minutes of footage removed. It received great acclaim from critics, but, unlike Lean's Great Expectations, another Dickens adaptation, no Oscar nominations. The film was banned in Israel for anti-semitism. It was banned in Egypt for portraying Fagin too sympathetically.

The March 1949 release of the film in Germany was met with protests outside the Kurbel Cinema by Jewish objectors. The Mayor of Berlin, Ernst Reuter, was a signatory to their petition which called for the withdrawal of the film. The depiction of Fagin was considered especially problematic in the recent aftermath of The Holocaust.

Beginning in the 1970s, the full-length version of Lean's film began to be shown in the United States. It is that version which is now available on DVD.

Reception 
The film was the fifth most popular film at the British box office in 1949. According to Kinematograph Weekly the 'biggest winner' at the box office in 1948 Britain was The Best Years of Our Lives with Spring in Park Lane being the best British film and "runners up" being It Always Rains on Sunday, My Brother Jonathan, Road to Rio, Miranda, An Ideal Husband, Naked City, The Red Shoes, Green Dolphin Street, Forever Amber, Life with Father, The Weaker Sex, Oliver Twist, The Fallen Idol and The Winslow Boy.

After the belated release of the film in the United States, Bosley Crowther praised it in The New York Times, writing:

 "...it is safe to proclaim that it is merely a superb piece of motion picture art and, beyond doubt, one of the finest screen translations of a literary classic ever made."

On Rotten Tomatoes, the film has an approval rating of 100% based on reviews from 24 critics, with an average rating of 8.6/10. The site's critics' consensus reads:

 "David Lean brings the grimy beauty of Charles Dickens' Victorian England to vivid cinematic life in Oliver Twist, a marvelous adaptation that benefits from Guy Green's haunting cinematography and Alec Guinness' off-kilter performance."

Legacy 
Author Marc Napolitano noted that Lean's version of Oliver Twist had an impact on almost every subsequent adaptation of Dickens's novel.  The film had two major additions that were not in the original novel. Of the opening scene, an idea that originated from Kay Walsh, Napolitano wrote:

 "The opening scene, which depicts the beleaguered and pregnant Agnes limping her way to the parish workhouse in the midst of a thunderstorm, presents a haunting image that would resonate with subsequent adaptors. Even more significantly, the finale to the Lean adaptation has eclipsed Dickens's own finale in the popular memory of the story; the climax atop the roof of Fagin's lair is breathtaking."

Songwriter Lionel Bart acknowledged that Lean's film "played a role in his conception" of the musical Oliver! Lean biographer Stephen Silverman referred to the 1968 film version of Oliver! as "more of an uncredited adaptation of the Lean film in story line and look than of either the Dickens novel or the Bart stage show."

Katharyn Crabbe wrote:

"One common complaint about the form of Dickens' Oliver Twist has been that the author fell so in love with his young hero that he could not bear to make him suffer falling into Fagin's hands a third time and so made him an idle spectator in the final half of the book."

Author Edward LeComte credited Lean for resolving the issue in his film version, where Oliver remains "at the center of the action" and has a "far more heroic" role.

See also
 BFI Top 100 British films

References

Bibliography
 Vermilye, Jerry. (1978). The Great British Films. Citadel Press, pp. 117–120. .

External links
 
 
 
 
 Matthew Dessen, 'Oliver Twist'.  "The Criterion Contraption" blog, 9 July 2005

1948 films
1948 drama films
British drama films
British black-and-white films
Films based on Oliver Twist
Films about orphans
Films directed by David Lean
Films produced by Ronald Neame
Films produced by Anthony Havelock-Allan
Films set in England
Films set in the 1820s
Films set in the 1830s
Films shot at Pinewood Studios
Film controversies in Israel
1940s English-language films
1940s British films
Antisemitic films
Antisemitism in the United Kingdom